Sebesi (also Sebeezee, or 'Bleezie') is an Indonesian island in the Sunda Strait, between Java and Sumatra, and part of the province of Lampung. Like Krakatoa, it too is volcanic, although there are no dated eruptions known. (A single report of an eruption in 1680 seems to be a confusion with the Krakatoa eruption reported from that year.) Unlike the Krakatoa Archipelago, Sebesi has permanent streams and is inhabited. Habitation is concentrated most heavily on the northern and eastern coasts of the island. 

Sebesi was devastated during the 1883 volcanic eruption of Krakatoa. Official records give approximately 3,000 people killed, with 1,000 of these being 'non-residents'.

By 1890, Sebesi was being re-cleared. It is believed that since it lies closer to Sumatra, it has served as a 'stepping stone' for much of the flora and fauna which was re-established at Krakatoa. By the 1920s, settlers had returned, and today Sebesi is virtually completely cultivated, with only a small area at the peak and some mangrove swamps still natural.

In December 2018, an eruption of Mount Anak Krakatau triggered a tsunami that hit the costal areas of the island, as well as several smaller islands nearby.

References

 Simkin and Fiske: Krakatau 1883; The Volcanic Eruption and Its Effects (1983)
 Ian Thornton: Krakatau: The Destruction and Reassembly of an Island Ecosystem (1996)

Islands of the Sunda Strait
Volcanoes of Indonesia
Subduction volcanoes
Inactive volcanoes
Krakatoa
Lampung
Uninhabited islands of Indonesia